The Illuminate World Tour was the third concert tour by Canadian singer Shawn Mendes, in support of his second studio album Illuminate (2016). The tour began in SSE Hydro, Glasgow, April 27, 2017, and concluded in Tokyo at the Tokyo International Forum on December 18, 2017.

Background and development 
After huge success from the Shawn Mendes World Tour, Mendes headlined his first all-arena tour. Mendes kicked off his tour in Europe for 21 shows, and North-America was set for 29 shows.

On February 22, 2017, Charlie Puth was announced as the opening act for the North American leg of the tour, and Rock in Rio announced Mendes as a performer of the festival in Rio de Janeiro.

Critical reception 
In a concert review from London Evening Standard, Matilda Egere-Cooper praised his vocals and his ability to make the concert enjoyable and meaningful at the same time, while writing, "he's got a lovely, soulful voice, reminiscent of Justin Timberlake, with a few dashes of Ed Sheeran. Then there is his musicianship, not only strumming along with a four-piece band, but twice on the piano. The second came at the end of the show on Treat You Better, which eventually descended into the hand-clapping slab of pop brilliance it's known for." The review rewarded the concert 4 out of 5 stars. Ryan Potter from Toronto Star wrote, "Mendes really did perform like this was an all-or-nothing show for him, not just month four on a nine-month world tour," while also noting how Mendes is still the same eager crowd-pleaser he was the last time he played the Air Canada Centre, while giving the show 3 out of 4 stars. Sadie Bell from Billboard praised his "seamless transitions from acoustic and electric guitars to piano, along with his impressively consistent vocals and high energy." Bell ends off by saying it was clear that Mendes was "destined to be far more than an internet phenomenon."

Set list 
This set list is representative of the show on August 17, 2017, in Newark. It is not representative of all concerts for the duration of the tour.

"There's Nothing Holdin' Me Back"
"Lights On"
"I Don't Even Know Your Name" / "Aftertaste" / "Kid in Love" 
"I Want You Back"
"The Weight"
"A Little Too Much"
"Stitches"
"Bad Reputation"
"Ruin"
"Castle on the Hill" / "Life of the Party"
"Three Empty Words"
"Patience"
"Roses"
"No Promises"
"Understand"
"Don't Be a Fool"
"Mercy"
"Never Be Alone"
Encore
"Treat You Better"

Tour dates

Cancelled shows

Notes

References

2017 concert tours
Shawn Mendes concert tours